Rubus schiedeanus is a Mesoamerican species of brambles in the rose family. It grows in southern Mexico (Chiapas, Oaxaca, Veracruz) and Central America (Guatemala, Honduras, Nicaragua, Honduras).

Rubus schiedeanus is a hairy and prickly perennial. Leaves are compound with 3 or 5 leaflets, thick and leathery. Flowers are white. Fruits are black.

References

schiedeanus
Flora of Mexico
Flora of Central America
Plants described in 1839